Gayatri (or Gayathri, Gaayathri, Gayathrie) is the feminine form of , a Sanskrit word for a song or a hymn. It may also refer to:
 The name of a Vedic poetic meter of 24 syllables (three lines of eight syllables each)
in particular, the Hindu Gayatri Mantra
 Hindu goddess Gayatri, as a personification of that mantra

Media

Films
 Gayathri (1977 film), a 1977 Tamil film
 Gayatri (2018 film), 2018 Telugu film
Gayatri Mahima, 1977 Indian film
 Gayathri (1973 film), a 1973 film
 Gayathri (TV series), a Tamil soap opera
Gayathri Maduve, 1983 Indian Kannada film
Ilayaval Gayathri, 2018 Indian Malayalam television series
Soorya Gayathri, 1992 Indian Malayalam-language drama film

Others
Gayathri Films, Indian film production and distribution company

People

Actress 
Gayatri, (born 1960), Indian actress
Gayatri Patel Bahl, American born Indian actress
Gayatri Rema, Indian actress
Gayatri Arun, Indian actress
Gayatri Joshi (born 1977), model turned Bollywood actress
Gayatri Jayaraman (born 1984), South Indian film actress
Gayathri, Indian actress
Gayathri Ashokan (born 1957), Indian film screenwriter
Gayathri Dias, Sri Lankan actress
Gayathri Mudigonda (born 1983), Indian–Swedish actress
Gayathri Raguram (born 1983), Tamil film actress
Gayathri Reddy, Indian model and actress
Gayathri Suresh (born 1992), Indian film actress
Gayathrie, Tamil film actress
Pushkar–Gayathri Indian husband and wife filmmaker duo

Music 
Gayatri Asokan (born 1978), Indian playback singer, working primarily in Malayalam
Gayatri Iyer (born 1985), Indian playback singer, working primarily in Bollywood
Gayatri Sankaran, Indian Carnatic musician
Gayathri Girish (born 1970s), Carnatic singer
Gayathri Govind, Indian classical dancer
Gayathri Khemadasa (born 1976), Sri Lankan composer and contemporary classical pianist
Gayathri Venkataraghavan, Carnatic singer
E. Gayathri (born 1959) Indian Carnatic musician
Ranjani–Gayatri, Indian Carnatic vocal and violin duo
 Siti Gayatri, member of JKT48

Sports
Gayatri Gole (born 1998), English cricketer
Gayatri Pawaskar (born 1999), youngest rifle shooter in India
Gayatri Reddy (born 1986), owner of team Deccan Chargers in the Indian Premier League
Gayathri Kariyawasam (born 1976), former Sri Lankan woman cricketer

Others 
Gayatri Chakravorty Spivak (born 1942), Indian literary theorist, philosopher
Gayatri Devi (1919–2009), third princess of Jaipur, a politician
Gayatri Devi (INC politician), an Indian politician from Madhya Pradesh
Gayatri Devi (BJP politician)
Gayatri Gopinath, associate professor at New York University
Gayatri Prasad Prajapati, Indian politician
Gayatri Rajapatni, 13th century queen consort of Majapahit empire
Gayatri Raje Pawar, Indian politician
Gayatri Reddy, Indian anthropologist
Gayatri Saraf (born 1952), Indian writer
Gayatri Shah, Nepalese politician
Gayatri Shunmugam (born 1986), Singaporean model and beauty queen
Gayatri Sinha, Indian art critic and curator
Gayathri Govindaraj (born 1991), Indian athlete
Gayathri Prabhu (born 1974), Indian novelist

Others 
Gayatri Gyan Mandir, Mahuda, Hindu temple in India
Gayatri River having a source at Mahabaleshwar, Maharashtra, India
Gayatri Vidya Parishad College of Engineering, Indian education institute
Gayatri Vihar, Indian colony in Uttarakhand
Gayatri Waterfalls, in Telangana, India
Gayathripuzha River, a river in Kerala, India
Maharani Gayatri Devi Girls' Public School, Indian school
Ved Mata Gaytri Mandir, Indian temple

Indian feminine given names